Gabrielle Bernstein is an American author, motivational speaker, and podcast host.

Early life and education 
Bernstein grew up in Larchmont, New York where she attended a Jewish summer camp and led a youth group. In 2001, she graduated from Syracuse University where she studied theatre.

Career
Bernstein is the author of nine books, including The Universe Has Your Back, Super Attractor and Happy Days. Bernstein teaches primarily from the text A Course In Miracles.

Personal life 
Bernstein had her first son, Oliver, with husband Zach Rocklin in December 2018.

Works 
 Add More ~ing To Your Life: A Hip Guide To Happiness (2010)  
MediDating: Meditations for Fearless Romance (2011)
 Spirit Junkie: A Radical Road to Discovering Self-Love and Miracles (2011)  
 May Cause Miracles: A 6-Week Kick-Start to Unlimited Happiness (2013) 
Miracles Now: 108 Life-Changing Tools for Less Stress, More Flow, and Finding Your True Purpose (2014) 
 The Universe Has Your Back: Transform Fear to Faith  (2016) 
 Judgment Detox: Release the Beliefs that Hold you Back from Living a Better Life (2018) 
Super Attractor: Methods for Manifesting a Life beyond Your Wildest Dreams (2019) 
You Are the Guru: 6 Messages to Help You Move Through Difficult Times with Certainty and Faith (2020)
Happy days: the guided path from trauma to profound freedom and inner peace (2022)

References

External links 
 

1979 births
Living people
Place of birth missing (living people)
People from Larchmont, New York
American motivational writers
Women motivational writers
American motivational speakers
Women motivational speakers
Life coaches
Syracuse University College of Visual and Performing Arts alumni
Jewish American writers
Motivational writers
21st-century American Jews